Steven R. Rudder is a retired United States Marine Corps lieutenant general and Naval Aviator. Rudder has served as Deputy Commandant for Aviation, USMC and Commanding General, United States Marine Corps Forces, Pacific.

Marine Corps career
Rudder was commissioned in the United States Marine Corps as a second lieutenant in 1984. He graduated from The Basic School at Marine Corps Base Quantico and his first assignment was to 3rd Amphibious Assault Battalion. He received a transfer to Naval Air Station Pensacola for flight training. He was designated a Naval Aviator in 1987. His operational assignments include AH-1 Cobra helicopter training with HMT-303 followed by service with HMLA-367 as Maintenance Officer and Tactics Instructor.

Rudder's staff and command assignments include HMM-161; Weapons and Tactics Officer deploying with the 11th MEU(SOC); AH-1 Division Head, Marine Aviation Weapons and Tactics Squadron One; Operations Officer, Marine Light Attack Helicopter Squadron 167; Future Operations Officer HMM-261 deploying with the 22nd MEU; Military Assistant to Andrew Marshall, Office of the Secretary of Defense, the Pentagon; Squadron Commander, HML/A-167; Senior Watch Officer, 3rd Marine Air Wing; J5 Lead planner for Afghanistan and Pakistan, USCENTCOM, Tampa, Florida; Commanding Officer of Marine Aircraft Group 26 deploying to Iraq, in support of Operation Iraqi Freedom; Branch Head of Aviation, Headquarters Marine Corps Aviation; student, United States Army War College; Legislative Assistant to the Commandant, Office of Legislative Affairs, HQMC; Commanding General, 1st Marine Air Wing in Okinawa, Japan; Director of Strategic Planning and Policy, United States Pacific Command; Deputy Commandant for Aviation from July 2017 to July 2020; and Commanding General, United States Marine Corps Forces, Pacific.

Rudder retired from active duty in September 2022.

Awards and decorations

References

United States Naval Aviators
Recipients of the Air Medal
Recipients of the Defense Superior Service Medal
Recipients of the Legion of Merit
United States Marine Corps generals
United States Marine Corps officers
Recipients of the Meritorious Service Medal (United States)
Year of birth missing (living people)
Living people